During the 1993–94 English football season, Swindon Town F.C. competed in the FA Premier League. It was Town's first (and, to date, only) season in the top flight of English football.

Season summary
Three years after winning promotion, and then being denied top-flight football for financial irregularities, the Robins finally reached the elite after 73 years of trying thanks to a pulsating 4–3 win over Leicester City in the Division One playoff final.

Soon after securing promotion, player-manager Glenn Hoddle left to take charge of Chelsea. His assistant John Gorman was expected to follow Hoddle to Stamford Bridge, but instead accepted Swindon's offer to become manager. He signed Norwegian striker Jan Aage Fjortoft from Rapid Vienna as well as another striker, Andy Mutch, from Wolves.

Swindon did not record a league win until their 17th game, winning just five games and becoming the first top division team in 30 years to concede 100 league goals, with only four clean sheets all season. They would have fared worse still had it not been for the strong form during the second half of the season of Jan Åge Fjørtoft, who was on target 12 times in the league, with all of his goals coming after the turn of the new year.

Swindon's first ever top-flight victory came on 24 November 1993 when a Keith Scott goal gave them a 1–0 home win over Queen's Park Rangers. Their 20th game of the season was a memorable one. They travelled to Anfield to face Liverpool, and managed to hold the home side to a 2–2 draw just over three months after they had crushed Swindon 5–0 at the County Ground. Midfielder John Moncur had put Swindon 1–0 up on the hour, and although Liverpool equalised after 71 minutes, Swindon restored their lead three minutes later with a goal from Keith Scott. They were still ahead with five minutes remaining, before an 86th-minute equaliser from Liverpool's Mark Wright denied Swindon a famous victory. Swindon won their next game 2–1 at home to Southampton. They held Sheffield Wednesday to a thrilling 3–3 draw at Hillsborough on 29 December with two goals from striker Craig Maskell. However, after the turn of the new year, Swindon found themselves on the receiving end of some more heavy defeats. On 15 January, they lost 6–2 to Everton at Goodison Park, though they did manage a narrow victory over Tottenham Hotspur in their next game, and within a month had fallen to a 5–0 defeat at Aston Villa. They were then crushed 7–1 at Newcastle on 12 March. A 2–2 home draw with Manchester United on 19 March sparked fresh hope that Swindon might just about climb to safety, but they collected just two points from their final eight games and were firmly rooted in bottom place. They had won just five league games all season and conceded 100 goals. Although a string of teams have since recorded fewer wins and points in the Premier League, none have yet matched Swindon's record for conceding the most goals.

John Gorman spoke of his hope that Swindon would soon return to the Premiership, saying that "[Swindon] wouldn't be in Division One for long . . . ". True to his word, Gorman lead Swindon to a consecutive relegation the following season, finishing in 21st place.

Final league table

Results
Swindon Town's score comes first

Legend

FA Premier League

FA Cup

League Cup

Squad

Starting 11
Only considering Premier League starts
 GK: #1,  Fraser Digby, 28
 RB: #2,  Nicky Summerbee, 36
 CB: #6,  Shaun Taylor, 42
 CB: #14,  Adrian Whitbread, 34
 LB: #3,  Paul Bodin, 28
 RM: #7,  John Moncur, 41
 CM: #5,  Luc Nijholt, 31
 CM: #16,  Kevin Horlock, 32
 LM: #10,  Martin Ling, 29
 CF: #9,  Jan Åge Fjørtoft, 36
 CF: #25,  Andy Mutch, 27

References

Swindon Town F.C. seasons
Swindon Town